Orphans & Vandals was an English indie rock band based in London. The band was formed by Al Joshua (guitar, harmonica, vocals, toy piano) and Raven (bass guitar, backing vocals, harmonium). Gabi Woo (drums, percussion, backing vocals, harmonium, glockenspiel), Quinta (strings, percussion) and Francesca Simmons (strings, percussion) were the other three band members. Quinta and Francesca left the band shortly after the release of their debut album. The album, I Am Alive and You Are Dead, was released in the UK in April 2009. The band received critical acclaim from various media outlets including BBC Radio 6 Music, NME and PopMatters.

Apple iTunes lists three out of the eight tracks on their album as having explicit lyrics. Their song "Mysterious Skin", which is over ten minutes long, includes a melodious and lyrical depiction of an orgasm and a reference to a homosexual sex act. Nonetheless, 6 Music allowed them to perform it on air as part of a live session for the Tom Robinson Show on 18 July 2008. Robinson stated that "the BBC has never banned Orphans And Vandals or their music".

In 2015, Al Joshua resurfaced with new solo material, some of which he wrote for the soundtrack of the upcoming film Set the Thames on Fire, which he also wrote.

Francesca Simmons releases material under the name Madame Česki.

References

External links 
 2008 session for BBC Radio 6 Music
 Music OMH Review
 Pop Matters Review

English rock music groups
Musical groups from London
English alternative rock groups